Basketball at the 1987 Pan American Games was held from August 9 to August 23, 1987 at the Market Square Arena in Indianapolis, United States. In men's basketball, Brazil defeated the U.S. 120–115 in the final to win the gold medal. The Brazilian team was led by their star player Oscar, who scored 46 points in the final.

Likewise, the women's basketball tournament was held from August 9 to August 23, 1987 at the same venue.

Men's competition

Participating nations

Matches

Gold medal match

Final ranking

Awards

Women's competition

Participating nations

Final ranking

Awards

References

Basketball
1987
Basketball in Indianapolis
1987
Pan
Pan
Pan